is a public aquarium, which is located in Toba, Mie, Japan. The aquarium houses 12 zones which reproduce natural environments, housing some 25,000 individuals representing 1,200 species.

The guests are free to tour the aquarium's grounds in any manner they please, as there is no fixed route. The total length of the aisle is about 1.5 kilometers.

History 
Toba Aquarium opened May 1955. It was founded by Haruaki Nakamura(中村幸昭), now the honorary president. It has received more than 50 million visitors, making it one of the most visited locations in Japan.

The aquarium hosts scholarly investigations as an adult education institution in conjunction with the Ministry of Education, Culture, Sports, Science and Technology officially specifying the Toba Aquarium as a museum. Toba Aquarium also emphasizes protection and breeding of rare marine creatures which are in danger of extinction. Notable breeding events include the  birth of a finless porpoise, a birth of the second generation sea otter for the first time in Japan.

Facilities 

The aquarium is divided into 12 main zones.
 Performance Stadium - featuring a sea lion show.
 Kingdom of Sea Animals - protection and breeding of marine mammals such as fur seals, earless seals, etc.
 Sea of Mermaid - featuring a Dugong exhibit.
 Ancient Sea - an exhibit showcasing living fossils such as Tachypleus tridentatus, nautilus, lungfish, Sand tiger, Sturgeon and so on. There is also image exhibition of Coelacanths.
 Coral Reef Diving - the staff breeds tropical fish, sea turtles and corals.
 Sea of Ise-Shima, Japanese Sea - an exhibit featuring creatures which live in Ise Bay or the Japanese neighboring waters such as finless porpoises, crabs and moray eels.
 Rivers in Japan - creatures which live in rivers in Japan such as cherry salmon.
 Jungle World - creatures which live in Amazon River and its drainage basin's jungles. For instance, Arapaimas are included.
 Sea of Polar Regions - sea otters, Commerson's dolphins and Baikal seals.
 Corridor of water - Humboldt penguins, Oriental small-clawed otters, smooth-coated otters, walrus, pelicans and other animals are exhibited.
 Crayfish Corner - species of crayfish are exhibited.
 Special exhibition room.

Others 
 In NHK's music program "Minna no Uta," Toba Aquarium's sea otters make an appearance.

Access 
Railway
Near by Kintetsu Shima Line Nakanogo Station
 In advertisements, the nearest station is announced as Toba Station, because Nakanogo Station does not stop Limited Express. 
Ferry
Near by Ise-wan Ferry Toba Port.
Car
Pay-as-you-stay type parking "Aqua parking" is next to Toba Aquarium for 400 cars.

See also

 Toba, Mie

Notes

External links 
 
 

Aquaria in Japan
Tourist attractions in Mie Prefecture
Buildings and structures in Mie Prefecture
Toba, Mie
Zoos established in 1955
1955 establishments in Japan